Linda Perham (born 29 June 1947) is a Labour politician in the United Kingdom.

Career
Perham was a councillor in the London Borough of Redbridge, representing the ward of Hainault and Mayor of the Borough in 1994–95. She was elected the Member of Parliament for Ilford North in 1997, when she defeated her Conservative predecessor Vivian Bendall. During her time in Parliament, she sat on various committees including the Trade and Industry and International Development select committees from 1998. She lost her seat in the 2005 general election to Conservative Lee Scott. By profession, she was a librarian, working latterly at Epping Forest College in Loughton. She was elected an honorary fellow of the Chartered Institute of Library and Information Professionals in 2003 and is a Fellow of the Royal Society of Arts, Manufactures and Commerce (FRSA).

After leaving Parliament, she held a number of non-executive director and trustee positions, including with the Consumer Council for Water, East Thames Group, TrustMark, the London Voluntary Service Council, Headway West London, the Friends of the Women's Library, and the European Care Group.

She is now Chair of the Thames Water Trust Fund, Director/Trustee, Vision Redbridge Culture and Leisure, Member of the Court, University of Leicester, President, Hainault Forest Community Association and a Justice of the Peace.

References

External links
BBC News MP profile
 They Work For You
 

1947 births
Labour Party (UK) MPs for English constituencies
Councillors in the London Borough of Redbridge
Female members of the Parliament of the United Kingdom for English constituencies
UK MPs 1997–2001
UK MPs 2001–2005
Alumni of the University of Leicester
Living people
20th-century British women politicians
21st-century British women politicians
20th-century English women
20th-century English people
21st-century English women
21st-century English people
Women councillors in England